An election to Dublin County Council in the electoral county of Dublin–Fingal within Dublin County took place on 20 June 1985 as part of that year's Irish local elections. Councillors were elected from local electoral areas on the system of proportional representation by means of the single transferable vote voting for a six-year term of office.

Dublin–Fingal was one of three electoral counties in Dublin County established by the Local Government (Reorganisation) Act 1985. Elections to Dublin County Council were also held in Dublin–Belgard and Dún Laoghaire–Rathdown.

Results by LEA

Balbriggan

Castleknock

Howth

Malahide

Mulhuddart

Swords

External links
 IrelandElection.com
 irishelectionliterature

References

1985 Irish local elections
1985